This is a list of people who were born, were raised, or have lived in Houston, Texas.

Entertainment, arts, and media personalities

 Mark Aguhar, multidisciplinary fine artist
 Debbie Allen, choreographer, actress
 Lauren Anderson, ballet dancer
 Wes Anderson, film director
 Archie Bell and the Drells, Soul/R&B music group
 Mark Ballas, ballroom dancer and choreographer from Dancing with the Stars, actor, singer-songwriter and musician (member of duo Alexander Jean)
 Kirko Bangz, rapper
 Bun B, rapper, one half of the rap duo UGK (Underground Kingz), raised in Houston
 Donald Barthelme, journalist
 Skye McCole Bartusiak, actress
 Baby Bash, rapper
 Texas Battle, actor
 Frank Beard, percussionist for ZZ Top
 Jeff Bennett, voice actor 
 Melissa Benoist, actress
 Michael Berry, from Orange, lawyer and radio talk show host
 Beyoncé, singer, songwriter, and actress
 Clint Black, musician
 Lisa Hartman Black, singer and actress
 B L A C K I E (born Michael LaCour), rapper
 Alexis Bledel, actress
 Maggie Blye, actress
 Craig Bohmler, composer
 Matt Bomer, from Spring, actor
 Booker T (born Booker Huffman Jr.), wrestler
 Danielle Bradbery, from Cypress, Texas, season 4 winner of The Voice
 Jonathan Breck, actor, best known as The Creeper in Jeepers Creepers
 Berkeley Breathed, born in California, cartoonist
 Jean Brooks, actress
 Karamo Brown, television personality and activist
 William Broyles Jr., screenwriter
 Ingrid Burley, rapper and songwriter
 Burnie Burns, filmmaker
 Johnny Bush, country singer
 William Butler, born in California; raised in The Woodlands; musician
 Win Butler, born in California; raised in The Woodlands
 Peter Cambor, actor
 Chandler Canterbury, actor
 Jonathan Caouette, filmmaker
 Chamillionaire (born Hakeem Seriki), rapper
 Machine Gun Kelly (musician), Singer, Rapper, and actor born in Houston, Texas 
 Lois Chiles, actress
 Imani Chyle, singer-songwriter and rapper
 Lynn Collins, actress
 Chedda Da Connect, rapper
 Dan Cook, sportswriter
 Peter James Cooper, screenwriter, film producer and businessman
 Nichole Cordova, singer for girl group Girlicious
 Walter Cronkite, television journalist
 Rodney Crowell, musician
 Peter Brett Cullen, actor
 Willie D, rapper
 Alexandria DeBerry, actress
 Loretta Devine, actress
 DhoomBros, YouTube personalities, actors, dancers, entertainers, and DJs
 Ryan Donowho, actor and musician
 Allen Drury, author
 Haylie Duff, actress
 Hilary Duff, actress and singer
 Shelley Duvall, actress
 Ike Eisenmann, sound effects
 Dorian Electra, singer
 Shannon Elizabeth, actress
 Terry Ellis, singer for R&B girl group En Vogue
 Robert Ellis, country singer 
 Kelly Emberg, model
 Sean Faris, actor
 Fenix TX, band
 Ashley Fink, actress of Glee
 Suzanne Finstad, author
 Sean Patrick Flanery, actor; from Sugar Land
 Mark Flood, artist
 Jake Flores, comedian
 Tom Ford, designer
 A. J. Foyt, auto racer
 Justin Furstenfeld
 Jennifer Garner, born in Houston; raised in Charleston, West Virginia; actress
 Greg Germann, actor
 Geto Boys members
 Billy Gibbons, guitarist and singer for ZZ Top
 Robert Glasper, musician
 Olivia Gonzales, dancer
 Neal Hamil, talent agent 
 R.W. Hampton, singer
 Lisa Hartman, actress
 Bill Hicks, comedian
 Dusty Hill, bassist and singer for ZZ Top
 Jay Hooks, blues musician
 Larry Hovis, actor
 Stevie Ray Huffman, Professional Wrestler
 Irene Dubois, drag performer
 Molly Ivins, journalist
 Cassandra Jean, actress, model
 Mickey Jones, musician
 Mike Jones, rapper
 Nicky Jones, voice actor
 Bradley Jordan, rapper
 Robert Earl Keen, singer
 Ruth Kelley, one of the first women to fly to Antarctica
 Candice King, actress and singer
 Solange Knowles, singer and songwriter
 Liza Koshy, actress and YouTube personality
 Eric Ladin, actor
 Hubert Laws, jazz musician
 Johnny Lee, singer 
 Richard Linklater, film director
 Lizzo, singer
 Lyle Lovett, from Klein, musician and actor
 Todd Lowe, actor
 Mark Lowry, Southern gospel vocalist, songwriter and comedian. Formerly sang with the Gaither Vocal Band
 LeToya Luckett, singer
 Debra Maffett, Miss America 1983
 Barbara Mandrell, singer
 Ayanna Jolivet McCloud, visual artist
 Maxine Mesinger, columnist
 Angelbert Metoyer, artist
 Mitchelle'l, singer-songwriter
 Farrah Moan, drag queen and entertainer
 Cole Mohr, model
 Jason Moore, Wikipedia editor and organizer
 Jason Moran, pianist
 Cory Morrow, country singer
 Lecrae Moore, Christian rapper, co-founder of Reach Records
 Johnny Nash, singer
 Edwin Neal, actor
 Michael Nesmith, musician, singer for The Monkees
 Iceman Nick, jeweler and jewelry designer
 Renee O'Connor, actress
 Mary-Jean O'Doherty, opera singer
 Tony Oller, actor
 Annette O'Toole, actress
 Jim Parsons, actor
 David Phelps, Christian singer
 DJ Premier (born Christopher Edward Martin)
 Billy Preston, keyboardist, and singer*
 James Prince, CEO & music executive of Rap-A-Lot  
 P. J. Proby, singer
 Dennis Quaid, actor
 Randy Quaid, actor
 Leven Rambin, actress
 Cierra Ramirez, actress
 Phylicia Rashad, actress
 Dan Rather, from Wharton, television journalist
 Prudencesa Renfro, singer
 Riff Raff (born Horst Christian Simco), rapper
 LaTavia Roberson
 Charlie Robison, singer
 Charlie Robinson, actor
 Kenny Rogers, singer
 Roger Rohatgi, independent film producer and screenwriter, motivational speaker, actor and ordained minister
 Kelly Rowland, singer
 Joshua Rush, actor
San Kim Sean - martial artist
 Scarface (rapper) (born Brad Terrence Jordan)
 Travis Scott, Grammy nominated artist, rapper, singer, songwriter, producer
 DJ Screw (born Robert Earl Davis, Jr.)
 Joan Severance, actress
 Guitar Shorty
 Anna Nicole Smith, born in Houston; raised in Mexia, model and actress
 Jaclyn Smith, actress
 South Park Mexican (born Carlos Coy)
 Brent Spiner, actor
 Megan Thee Stallion, rapper
 Matt Stone, co-creator of South Park
 Patrick Swayze, actor
 Susan Swift, actress
 Amir Taghi, fashion designer
 B. J. Thomas, singer
 Larry D. Thomas, 2008 Texas State Poet Laureate
 Slim Thug (born Stayve Jerome Thomas), rapper
 Gary Tinterow, art historian and curator
 Don Toliver, rapper
 Allison Tolman, actress
 Nephew Tommy, actor
 Rigo Tovar, emigrated from Matamoros, Tamaulipas, Mexico
 Trae tha Truth (born Frazier Othel Thompson), rapper
 Tommy Tune, dancer and choreographer
 Steve Tyrell, singer and music producer
 Ngozi Ukazu, author
 The Undertaker (born Mark William Calaway), wrestler
 Brooke Valentine, singer
 Ameer Vann (former member of Brockhampton), rapper
 Jaci Velasquez, singer
 Sauce Walka, rapper
 Paul Wall, rapper
 Isaiah Washington, actor
 Watermark, band
 Waterparks, band
 William Ward Watkin, architect
 Johnny Guitar Watson, musician, singer, and songwriter
 Alicia Webb, wrestling personality
 Wesley Weston, Jr., rapper
 Al White, actor
 JoBeth Williams, actress
 Chandra Wilson, actress
 Harris Wittels, actor, writer, comedian, musician
 Z-Ro (born Joseph Wayne McVey)
 Renée Zellweger, from Katy, actress
 Gwendolyn Zepeda, author 
 Trevor Daniel, singer
 Will Flanary, ophthalmologist and comedian

Business, government, law, and military

 Elsa Alcala, judge since 2011 of the Texas Court of Criminal Appeals
 Monroe Dunaway Anderson, banker; cotton trader; co-founder of Anderson, Clayton and Company; philanthropist; namesake of University of Texas MD Anderson Cancer Center 
 Mary Kay Ash, cosmetics mogul
 James A. Baker (born 1821), lawyer and founder of the law firm now known as Baker and Botts.
 James A. Baker (born 1857), lawyer for William Marsh Rice and trustee for Rice University.
 James A. Baker Jr., a lawyer for the law firm now known as Baker and Botts, banker, and real estate developer.
 James A. Baker III, White House chief of staff, Secretary of State 
 Nandita Berry, Houston lawyer and 109th Secretary of State of Texas
 Paul Bettencourt, member of the Texas State Senate from District 7
 Jeff Bezos, founder and CEO of Amazon.com
 Bill Blythe, Houston realtor and former state representative
 Paul Bremond, merchant and railroad developer.
 George H. W. Bush, 43rd Vice President and 41st President of the United States; father of George W. Bush
 George W. Bush, former Governor of Texas (1995–2000) and 43rd President of the United States; son of George H.W. Bush
 Jeb Bush, former Governor of Florida (1999–2007), and former 2016 presidential candidate; brother of George W. Bush
 Briscoe Cain, Republican member of the Texas House
 William L. Clayton, cotton trader; cofounder of Anderson Clayton Co., government official
 Ted Cruz, U.S. senator from Texas; former 2016 Republican presidential candidate 
 Michael Dell, founder and CEO of Dell Inc. 
 Richard W. Dowling, Civil War officer
 Anna Johnson Dupree (1891–1977), business owner and philanthropist
 Les Eaves, Republican member of the Arkansas House of Representatives for White County; former Houston resident
 Gary Elkins, politician
 Tilman J. Fertitta, businessman and reality TV personality
 Nobia A. Franklin (1892–1934), African American beauty mogul
 Jay F. Honeycutt, former director of the Kennedy Space Center; began career in Houston in 1966 as engineer at Johnson Space Center
 Edward Mandell House, diplomat, a commissioner of the Paris Peace Conference of 1919, and advisor of Woodrow Wilson.
 Joan Huffman, politician 
 Howard Hughes, billionaire aviator, film producer 
 Thad Hutcheson, politician 
 Jesse H. Jones, politician 
 Barbara Jordan, U.S. Representative 
 Mickey Leland, politician 
 James E. Lyon, banker
 Gray H. Miller, Senior United States District Judge of the United States District Court for the Southern District of Texas
 Steve Munisteri, politician 
 David Newell, judge of the Texas Court of Criminal Appeals, Place 9
 Tom Oliverson, anesthesiologist and incoming state representative for District 130 
 Dan Patrick, Lieutenant Governor of Texas, outgoing member of the Texas State Senate 
 Dennis Paul, state representative from District 129 in Harris County
 Gilbert Pena, incoming 2015 Republican member of the Texas House of Representatives from Pasadena, lived in Houston prior to 1992 
 Jack Porter, U.S. Senate candidate in 1948 and a builder of the modern Texas Republican Party
 Leighton Schubert, state representative from Caldwell, Texas; former Houston resident
 Jim Sharp, state court judge, 2009–2014
 Stephen Susman (1941–2020), plaintiffs attorney and a founding partner of Susman Godfrey
 Kathryn J. Whitmire, first female Mayor of Houston; served five terms
 Jared Woodfill, Houston attorney and former chairman of the Harris County Republican Party
 Kevin Patrick Yeary, judge of the Texas Court of Criminal Appeals, based in San Antonio; former assistant district attorney for Harris County

Religion

 Yolanda Adams
 Charles L. Allen
 Kim Burrell
 Finis Alonzo Crutchfield
 Rafael Cruz
 Yusuf Estes
 Jerry Johnston
 David Koresh
 Hal Lindsey
 Joel Osteen
 Paul Pressler
 Hyman Judah Schachtel
 Marianne Williamson

Science

 Red Adair, oil-well firefighter
 Denton Cooley, heart surgeon
 Michael DeBakey, heart surgeon
 James "Red" Duke, trauma surgeon
 Bonnie J. Dunbar, astronaut, professor, Director of Aerospace Engineering and Director of STEM Center at the University of Houston
 Mary K. Estes, Ph.D., professor in molecular virology and microbiology and in medicine-gastroenterology at Baylor College of Medicine, founding director of the Texas Medical Center Digestive Diseases Center
 William V. Houston, physicist and president of Rice University
 Lydia Kavraki, Ph.D., computer scientist
 Dr. Ellen Ochoa, Director of NASA Johnson Space Center, veteran astronaut
 Richard Smalley, chemist, physicist and astronomer; recipient of the Nobel Prize in Chemistry (1996)
 Robert Woodrow Wilson, astronomer; born in Houston and graduated from Rice University (1957); recipient of the Nobel Prize in Physics (1976)

Athletics

 Cammile Adams, Olympic swimmer
 Sam Adams, football player 
 Lance Alworth, football player 
 Heather Armbrust, IFBB professional bodybuilder
 Tim Atchison, former American football player
 H. B. Bailey, auto racer 
 Harold Bailey, football player
 Keith Baldwin, football player
 Joey Banes, football player
 Daniel Bard, Major League Baseball (MLB)) pitcher 
 Pat Batteaux, football player
 Shane Baz (born 1999), MLB pitcher
 Simone Biles, gymnast
 Michael Bishop, football player 
 Booker T (born Booker Tio Huffman, Jr.), professional wrestler 
 Jason Bourgeois, baseball player 
 Michael Bourn, former MLB outfielder who played for the Houston Astros
 Jeff Bourns, tennis player 
 Joe Bowman, marksman of the American West 
 Ken Bradshaw, big wave surfer
 Jimmy Butler, NBA basketball player
 Mark Calaway, professional wrestler
 Tina Chandler, IFBB professional bodybuilder
 Jermall Charlo, boxer
 Roger Clemens, former MLB pitcher who played for the Houston Astros 
 Brad Coleman, auto racer
 Carl Crawford, baseball player
 Dalip Rana (The Great Khali), professional wrestler, promoter, model and actor
 Sedrick Curry, football player 
 Andy Dalton, football player, from Katy, Texas
 Santia Deck, athlete
 Jimmy Demaret, golfer
 Gerald Dockery, football player
 Karl Douglas, football player
 Clyde Drexler, basketball player
 Donald Driver, retired football player
 Tyler Duffey, Baseball Player
 Adam Dunn, baseball player 
 Aaron Durley, basketball player 
 George Foreman, boxer
 Eddie Foster, NFL player
 A. J. Foyt, auto racer 
 Andrew Friedman, MLB executive
 Zina Garrison, tennis player, born in Houston; resident of Missouri City, Texas
 Donovan Greer, football player 
 Brittney Griner, basketball player
 Ben Guez, baseball player
 Charlie Haas, retired professional wrestler
 Brede Hangeland, soccer player
 Lindsey Harding, basketball player 
 Will Harris, MLB relief pitcher who played for the Houston Astros
 D. J. Hayden, professional football player currently on the Oakland Raiders
 Warrick Holdman, football player 
 Jonathan Horton, gymnast 
 Jalen Hurts, football player
 Germain Ifedi, football player
 Steve Jackson, former defensive back who is currently the senior offensive assistant for the Atlanta Falcons
 Craig James, football player
 Brandon Jordan, football player
 DeAndre Jordan, basketball player
 Kaitlyn, wrestler 
 Joshua Kalu, football player
 Scott Kazmir, MLB pitcher who played for the Houston Astros 
 Greg Kindle, football player
 Gary Kubiak, football coach
 Iris Kyle, ten-time overall Ms. Olympia professional bodybuilder
 Rashard Lewis, basketball player 
 Tara Lipinski, figure skater, Olympic gold medalist, from Sugar Land 
 Denzel Livingston (born 1993), basketball player for Hapoel Kfar Saba of the Israeli Liga Leumit
 James Loney, baseball player 
 Andrew Luck, football player 
 Marie Mahoney, outfielder, All-American Girls Professional Baseball League player
 Guy Mezger, mixed martial artist
 Tyler Myers, ice hockey player
Josh Nebo (born 1997), basketball player for Maccabi Tel Aviv of the Israeli Premier Basketball League
 Chiney Ogwumike, basketball player
 Emeka Okafor, basketball player 
 Yaxeni Oriquen-Garcia, IFBB professional bodybuilder
 Josh Pastner, college basketball coach
 Andy Pettitte, former MLB pitcher from Deer Park, Texas, who played for the Houston Astros 
 Gene Phillips, basketball player 
 Mel Renfro, football player 
 Mary Lou Retton, gymnast, 1984 Olympic gold medalist 
 Cody Risien, football player 
Taylor Rochestie (born 1985) American-Montenegrin player in the Israel Basketball Premier League
 Michael Russell, tennis player
 Kevin Schwantz, motorcycle racer 
 Bob Smith, football player
 David Starr, auto racer 
 Kohl Stewart, professional baseball pitcher for the Minnesota Twins
 Michael Strahan, American-German retired football player, actor, and television personality; currently hosts Good Morning America and NFL on FOX; born and raised in Houston before moving to Mannheim, (West) Germany 
 Mike Swick, UFC fighter 
 Thurman Thomas, football player from Missouri City, Texas 
 Tyler Thornburg, baseball player
 Justin Tucker, football player (kicker)
Will Vest, Professional Baseball Player
 Billy Wade, auto racer
 Bones Weatherly, football player
 Kaitlyn Weaver, Olympic ice dancer
 Ruston Webster, Scout for the Atlanta Falcons
 Kip Wells, baseball player 
 Billy Welu, professional bowler
 Reggie White, football player
 Alfred Williams, football player
 Willie Williams, football player
 Woody Williams, former MLB pitcher who played for the Houston Astros 
 George Wright, football player
 James Young, football player
 Joe Young, basketball player
 Vince Young, football player

See also

 List of people from Texas

References

Houston, Texas
 
Houston
People